The Kent House, also known as Sydney Kent House or St. James Convent, is a Queen Anne style house located at 2944 South Michigan Avenue in Chicago, Illinois, United States.  The house was designed in 1883 by Burnham & Root for Sidney A. Kent.  From 1896 to 1906, it was the home of barbed-wire industrialist and robber baron John Warne Gates, better known as "Bet-a-Million" Gates for his gambling excesses.

In the early 20th century, it served as the main building for what is today, National-Louis University.

It was listed on the National Register of Historic Places in 1977, and it was designated a Chicago Landmark on March 18, 1987.

References

Burnham and Root buildings
Houses completed in 1883
Houses on the National Register of Historic Places in Chicago
Chicago Landmarks
National Louis University
1883 establishments in Illinois